Smith Pool is a small body of water located between Salem Neck, Winter Island, and Cat Cove in Salem, Massachusetts, United States. It used to be the city's reservoir, and was later a public swimming area. It is easily accessible from Winter Island Road on Winter Island. The area is currently maintained by Salem State University, and the old dam still separates it from Cat Cove.

Ponds of Massachusetts
Bodies of water of Essex County, Massachusetts
Salem, Massachusetts